Archduchess Yolande of Austria (née Princesse Yolande Marie Jeanne Charlotte de Ligne; born 6 May 1923) is the widow of Archduke Carl Ludwig of Austria.

Family
Yolande was born in Madrid as the second daughter of Eugène, 11th Prince de Ligne and his wife Philippine de Noailles (1898-1991). Her father was the Belgian ambassador to India from 1947 to 1951, ambassador to Spain from 1951 to 1958, and the head of one of Belgium's historically most influential noble families. He died in 1960.

Each of Yolande's two brothers became the Prince de Ligne (Baudouin, 12th Prince de Ligne and Antoine, 13th Prince de Ligne). Antoine is the father of Michel, 14th Prince de Ligne and Princess Christine, wife of Prince Antônio of Orléans-Braganza (second-in-line to the defunct Brazilian throne). Antoine's youngest daughter is named after Yolande.

Biography

Marriage and issue
On 17 January 1950 at the Château de Beloeil, Belgium (the family seat of the House of Ligne), Yolande married Archduke Carl Ludwig of Austria (1918–2007). The fifth child of Austria's last emperor, Charles I and his wife Zita of Bourbon-Parma, Carl Ludwig and Yolande were childhood sweethearts. Wedding guests included Carl Ludwig's eldest brother Crown Prince Otto (claimant to the Habsburg throne) as well as members of half a dozen other royal families; representatives of the Belgian royal family did not, however, attend. The couple honeymooned in Florida, eventually settling in New York City, where Carl Ludwig worked for the Rockefeller Foundation.

They had four children:
Archduke Rudolf (b. 1950), married Baroness Hélène de Villenfagne de Vogelsanck (b. 1954) in Brussels 3 July 1976, their family taking up residence in Belgium thereafter. On 29 May 1978 he and his children and male-line descendants were incorporated in the nobility of Belgium by royal letters patent with the style of Serene Highness and the hereditary title "Prince of Habsburg-Lorraine".
Archduchess Alexandra (born 1952); married Chilean ambassador to the Holy See Héctor Riesle Contreras. They have three children.
Archduke Carl Christian (born 1954) married Princess Marie Astrid of Luxembourg on 6 February 1982 in Luxembourg. They have five children.
Archduchess Maria Constanza (born 1957) married Franz Josef, Prince von Auersperg-Trautson. They have four daughters.

References

Sources

 Coddington, John Insley, "The Franco-American Ancestry and Connections of the Archduchess Yolande of Austria: Murat, Fraser, Noailles et al.," The American Genealogist, 64 (July 1989): 171–78.

1923 births
Living people
House of Ligne
Princesses of Ligne
Austrian princesses
Belgian Roman Catholics
20th-century Roman Catholics
21st-century Roman Catholics
Belgian people of French descent
Belgian expatriates in Spain